Federico Commandino (1509 – 5 September 1575) was an Italian humanist and mathematician.

Born in Urbino, he studied at Padua and at Ferrara, where he received his doctorate in medicine.  He was most famous for his central role as translator of works of ancient mathematicians. In this, his sources were primarily written in Greek and secondarily in Arabic, while his translations were primarily in Latin and secondarily in Italian. He was responsible for the publication of many treatises of Archimedes.  He also translated the works of Aristarchus of Samos (On the sizes and distances of the Sun and the Moon), Pappus of Alexandria (Mathematical collection), Hero of Alexandria (Pneumatics), Ptolemy of Alexandria (Planisphere and Analemma), Apollonius of Perga (Conics) and Euclid of Alexandria (Elements). Among his pupils was Guidobaldo del Monte and Bernardino Baldi. Commandino maintained a correspondence with the astronomer Francesco Maurolico. The proposition known as Commandino's theorem first appears in his work on centers of gravity.

References

Sources

E Rosen, Biography in Dictionary of Scientific Biography (New York 1970-1990).
J V Field, The invention of infinity : Mathematics and art in the Renaissance (Oxford, 1997).
M Kemp, The science of art (New Haven, 1992).
D Bertoloni Meli, Guidobaldo dal Monte and the Archimedean revival, Nuncius Ann. Storia Sci. 7 (1) (1992), 3-34.
M Biagioli, The social status of Italian mathematicians, 1450-1600, Hist. of Sci. 27 (75)(1) (1989), 41-95.
S Drake and I Drabkin, Mechanics in Sixteenth-Century Italy (Madison, Wis., 1969), 41-44.
T Frangenberg, The image and the moving eye : Jean Pélerin (Viator) to Guidobaldo del Monte, J. Warburg Courtauld Inst. 49 (1986), 150-171.
E Gamba, Documents of Muzio Oddi for the history of the proportional compass (Italian), Physis Riv. Internaz. Storia Sci. (N.S.) 31 (3) (1994), 799-815.
P D Napolitani, Commandino and Maurolico : publishing the classics (Italian), in Torquato Tasso and the University (Italian), Ferrara, 1995 (Florence, 1997), 119-141.
P Neville, The printer's copy of Commandino's translation of Archimedes, 1558, Nuncius Ann. Storia Sci. 1 (2) (1986), 7-12.
P L Rose, Commandino, John Dee, and the De superficierum divisionibus of Machometus Bagdedinus, Isis 63 (216) (1972), 88-93.
P L Rose, Plusieurs manuscrits autographes de Federico Commandino à la Bibliothèque Nationale de Paris, Rev. Histoire Sci. Appl. 24 (4) (1971), 299-307.
P L Rose, The Italian Renaissance of Mathematics (Geneva, 1975), 185-221.
P L Rose, Letters illustrating the career of Federico Commandino, Physis - Riv. Internaz. Storia Sci. 15 (1973), 401-410.
E Rosen, John Dee and Commandino, Scripta mathematica 28 (1970), 321-326.

Bibliography

Archimedis De iis quae vehuntur in aqua libri duo/ a Frederico Commandino restituti et commentariis illustrati, Bononiae: Ex officina Alexandri Benacii (1565), 45 p.

External links

1509 births
1575 deaths
People from Urbino
Italian Renaissance humanists
16th-century Italian mathematicians